Bharali Naamghar is a temple situated in Bharali village. Bharali is approximately 2 km away from Hatbor, a place of historical importance under the Kaliabor subdivision in the Nagaon district in Assam in India. People from the Nagaon district are mostly agriculture oriented and are guided by rich Sattria (Eksarana religion) culture.

History
For about 150 to 200 years Bharali Naamghar was situated in the then 'Bamgaon', currently known as 'Daulpukhuri'. Bapuram Deo of Balisatra took the initiative in establishing the Naamghar. The Naamghar was burnt down by the Burmese Army (during the Burmese invasion of Assam between 1817 and 1826). Having no other option, the villagers left the place and re-established themselves in Bharali Gaon. Accordingly, the Naamghar (popularly known as Bharali Naamghar) came into being.

One of the interesting aspects of the Bharali Naamghar is the 'Laikhuta' (main pillar of the building) made by Tulsi tree (holy Basil). There are faiths and beliefs about the Laikhuta and preserved well near 'Simhasana' or 'Guruasana'. It is believed that the Bharali Naamghar  is the holy place to visit for fulfilling wishes. The local seniors used to say that the Naamghar is the rest house of 'Burha Dangoria' (a holy sprit).

Infrastructure
The infrastructure of Bharali Naamghar has totally changed with time. With the help of local people and devotees from different places bamboo poles, thatched roof, mud floor are replaced with cement pillar, tin and ceiling, modern floor style respectively. Keeping in view the increasing number of devotees, now the facilities of the washroom, rest house, guest house, banquet hall, auditorium, etc. are provided by the naamghar managing committee. The finance is properly and strictly managed by the committee.

Cultural Fastival
Maghi Purnima or Makar Sankranti is an auspicious day. On this day thousands of devotees visit Bharali Naamghar to fulfill their wishes . A lot of devotees come to the Naamghar especially in the sacred month of Bhado (August -September) and Maagh (January–February). Spirituality lies in the sound of Doba and Borkaah(instruments to play during prayer) that removes negative power and welcomes the positive. To perform 'Naam-Prasanga'(communal prayer) and 'Bhaona'(theatrical performance) in Srimanta Sankardeva(Vaishnava guru) Tithi (observatory day) and Shree Shree Madavdeva (Vaishnava guru and disciple of Srimanta Sankardev)Tithi is a tradition in Bharali Naamghar. It is said that if a child is unable to walk in time people offer bamboo stick to the  Naamghar, if someone lost his cow people offer Diya(oil lamp),as a remedy of late marriage devotees visit with Diya and Sarai(raw fruits,Maah -Prasad as offering). Individuals can feel the existence of divine power in the Naamghar.

Image Gallery

References

External Links 

Ekasarana Dharma
Hindu temples in Assam